Navmar Applied Sciences Corporation is an American engineering company.

Operations
Navmar provides engineering and technical solutions in the area of acoustics, electronics, aerodynamics, systems engineering, prototyping, sensors, electro-optics, materials, system integration, and corrosion protection to defence departments globally. It offers acoustic and non-acoustic sensors, and sonobuoys for undersea surveillance and exploration; unmanned aircraft systems; personnel for unmanned aircraft mission support; and analysis and engineering services for aircraft subsystems and related equipment.

The company was founded in 1977 by CEO and President Thomas Fenerty and is based in Warminster, Pennsylvania, with locations and operations in the United States.

Unmanned Aerial Vehicles

 ArcticShark
 NASC Tracer
 RQ-23 TigerShark
 Sonex Aircraft Teros
 TigerShark XP

Government contracts
Navmar Applied Sciences Corporation has worked on 194 contracts worth $1.23 billion in obligations from the U.S. Federal Government from FY2007 to 2017.
 A high of $253 million in obligations in FY2011
 A low of $32.1 million in obligations in FY2009

Principle agencies
 Department of Defense
 Department of Transportation
 General Services Administration

References

External links
 https://www.fool.com/investing/2017/03/19/3-cheap-weapons-systems-president-trump-pentagon-w.aspx
 http://www.oneidadispatch.com/article/OD/20161202/NEWS/161209981

Engineering companies of the United States